The 2019–20 season is the xth season in Politehnica Iași's history, and the yth in the top-flight of Romanian football. Politehnica is competing in Liga I and in the Cupa României.

Players

Current squad
Updated last, 1 July 2019

Transfers

In

Loans in

Out

Loans out

Overall transfer activity

Expenditure

Income

Net Totals

Pre-season and friendlies

Competitions

Overview

Liga I

The Liga I fixture list was announced in July 2019.

Regular season

Table

Results by round

Matches

Cupa României

Politehnica will enter the Cupa României at the Round of 32.

Statistics

Appearances and goals

|-
|}

Squad statistics
{|class="wikitable" style="text-align: center;"
|-
! 
! style="width:70px;"|Liga I
! style="width:70px;"|Cupa României
! style="width:70px;"|Home
! style="width:70px;"|Away
! style="width:70px;"|Total Stats
|-
|align=left|Games played       || 0 || 0 || 0 || 0 || 0 
|-
|align=left|Games won          || 0 || 0 || 0 || 0 || 0 
|-
|align=left|Games drawn        || 0 || 0 || 0 || 0 || 0 
|-
|align=left|Games lost         || 0 || 0 || 0 || 0 || 0 
|-
|align=left|Goals scored       || 0 || 0 || 0 || 0 || 0 
|-
|align=left|Goals conceded     || 0 || 0 || 0 || 0 || 0 
|-
|align=left|Goal difference    || 0 || 0 || 0 || 0 || 0 
|-
|align=left|Clean sheets       || 0 || 0 || 0 || 0 || 0 
|-
|align=left|Goal by Substitute || 0 || 0 || 0 || 0 || 0 
|-
|align=left|Total shots        || – || – || – || – || – 
|-
|align=left|Shots on target    || – || – || – || – || – 
|-
|align=left|Corners            || – || – || – || – || – 
|-
|align=left|Players used       || – || – || – || – || – 
|-
|align=left|Offsides           || – || – || – || – || – 
|-
|align=left|Fouls suffered     || – || – || – || – || – 
|-
|align=left|Fouls committed    || – || – || – || – || – 
|-
|align=left|Yellow cards       || 0 || 0 || 0 || 0 || 0 
|-
|align=left|Red cards          || 0 || 0 || 0 || 0 || 0 
|-
|align=left| Winning rate      || 0% || 0% || 0% || 0% || 0% 
|-

Goalscorers

Goal minutes

Last updated: 2019 (UTC) 
Source: Soccerway

Hat-tricks

Clean sheets

Disciplinary record

Attendances

See also

 2019–20 Cupa României
 2019–20 Liga I

References

FC Politehnica Iași (2010) seasons
Politehnica, Iași, FC